Amalda mamillata, common name the mammillate ancilla, is a species of sea snail, a marine gastropod mollusc in the family Ancillariidae.

Description
The length of the shell varies between 30 mm and 60 mm.

Distribution
This marine species occurs off Taiwan and in the South China Sea

References

External links

 

mamillata
Gastropods described in 1844